Austin Edwin Fife (December 18, 1909 – February 7, 1986) and Alta Stevens Fife (March 16, 1912 – December 8, 1996) are the pioneering Utah folklorists for whom the Fife Folklore Archives, the Fife Folklore Conference, and the Fife Honor Lecture are each named at Utah State University. This husband and wife duo dedicated much of their time for collecting and preserving the cultural expressions of the American West and Mormon folklore. The Fifes’ work has influenced not only the generations of folklorists who have tried to follow in their footsteps but also the lives of countless Utahans, who have enjoyed a richer cultural experience because of the many folk festivals and folklore programs inspired by the Fifes’ dedication and service.

The Fifes: Research Partners
Called “the founders of Mormon folklore studies” by Eric A. Eliason, Austin and Alta Fife were dedicated to the future of folkloristics in Utah (153). Barbara Lloyd explains that “Austin and Alta Fife . . . met at Utah State University. . . . [and] as a married couple, they began folklore research together in the late 1930s when they were living in California, where Austin was a graduate student at Stanford University, serving as research assistant to the distinguished professor of Hispanic-American folklore, Aurelio Espinosa, Sr.” (2004, 230).

Notably, the Fifes worked together as a team, an aspect of their folkloristic efforts that David Stanley identifies as one of the two items he finds “especially pertinent and interesting to the study and collection of Utah folklore” (2004, 1). The other interesting item that Stanley mentions is an interview transcript of Alta, who describes her trip with Austin across the country following the “Mormon Trail” from Palmyra, New York, to Salt Lake City, Utah. Stanley explains that “the Fifes’ purpose on this journey was to collect not Mormon folklore but folklore about Mormons from those residents of the Midwest who still recounted tales about ‘when the Mormons were here’” (1).

In his essay focused on the Fifes, William A. Wilson describes their profound influence on folklore in Utah: 
Austin and Alta Fife devoted much of their lives to interpreting the Mormon and Western culture that had produced them. Just as their parents and grandparents had helped pioneer the West, they broke new ground in American folklore scholarship—in the study of Mormon folklore, cowboy and western folksong, and material folk culture—and charted a course others were to follow (2004, 41).

The Fifes and Folkloristics at USU

In 1960, the Fifes returned to Utah so that Austin could teach classes at Utah State University (USU) in French and folklore (Lloyd 230). When Austin planned to retire in the 1970s, he selected William A. Wilson to run the folklore program at USU because Wilson seemed like “someone who could provide strong leadership for the new [folklore] archive and who had the right kind of vision for the future, for what the USU folklore program could become” (Lloyd 231).  As a result of the Fifes folklore research and advocacy, USU now has a folklore program, the Fife Folklore Workshop, the Fife Folklore Archives, the Fife Folklore Conference, and a legacy of folkloristic scholarship worth being proud of.

The Fife Folklore Archives

According to USU's "History"webpage, the Fifes donated their collection of folklore research to Utah State University’s Merrill-Cazier Library in 1966, a collection which was eventually called the Fife Folklore Archives: “one of a number of leading research facilities that acquire, preserve and make available the materials in folklore fields.”

The Fife Folklore Conferences

The Fife Folklore Conference is a five-day workshop that gives USU students a chance to meet folklore scholars from other colleges throughout the United States. In an essay dedicated to this topic, Barbara Lloyd, director of one of the many Fife Folklore Conferences, describes it this way:

The conference was a perfect time for us to gather together people we loved, to talk about ideas we loved, and nothing else really mattered. It was and is a brief and shining moment for folklore. (238)

Lloyd also asserts that “some of the greatest lessons in folklore were available to be learned at the Fife Conference” each year, where she learned from folklorist William A. Wilson “that the separations between fine art and folk art, between high-brow literature and folk narrative, are so minimal that it would be much more accurate to speak of all literature and not make the separations that we do,” but from Austin Fife she learned “about the stuff itself—our folklore—and how it matters, even how texts can matter apart from context or performance . . . and how any context is magnified and often enriched and nourished by the traditional elements it may contain” (Lloyd 2004, 236–37).

Wilson and the Fife Honor Lecture

In his essay, “Building Bridges: Folklore in the Academy,” William A. Wilson explains that a friend of his at USU encouraged him “to join the faculty there and to continue the work begun earlier by prominent folklorist Austin Fife” (29). Wilson also established the Fife Honor Lecture “as a way to pay tribute to outstanding folklorists, and later, under the direction of Barre Toelken, the honor was extended to include anyone who was doing interesting work in folklore or folklore-related fields” (Lloyd 233).

Publications

“Saints of Sage and Saddle by the Fifes remains the most complete book-length treatment of Mormon folklore” (Terry Rudy 2004, 144).

See also
Three Nephites

References

External links
Fife Slide Collection of Western U.S. Vernacular Architecture: Utah State University 
Photos of Alta and Austin Fife from the Utah Folklorist Image Collection, Digital Collection: Utah State University

American folklorists
Mormon studies scholars
People from Utah
Married couples